Crain's Wholesale and Retail Store, at College and Broadway Sts. in Jackson, Kentucky, was built in c.1908-1914.  It was listed on the National Register of Historic Places in 1986.

It was a two-story nine-bay brick commercial building.  It has a pressed metal cornice and a cast iron facade first floor produced by the George Mesker Ironworks.

The building appears to have been moved or destroyed.

References

National Register of Historic Places in Breathitt County, Kentucky
Commercial buildings completed in 1914
1914 establishments in Kentucky
Former buildings and structures in Kentucky